Thiago Rodrigues Coelho (born 26 May 1995 in Cascavel), known as Thiago Coelho or just Thiago, is a Brazilian footballer who plays as a goalkeeper for Paysandu.

Honours
Remo
Campeonato Paraense: 2019
Copa Verde: 2021

Paysandu
Copa Verde: 2022

References

External links
 Thiago's Profile on Luzz Sports

1995 births
Living people
Brazilian footballers
Campeonato Brasileiro Série B players
Coritiba Foot Ball Club players
Esporte Clube Flamengo players
Clube Atlético Itapemirim players
Guarany Sporting Club players
Esporte Clube XV de Novembro (Jaú) players
Associação Esportiva Velo Clube Rioclarense players
Clube do Remo players
Paysandu Sport Club players
Association football goalkeepers
People from Cascavel
Sportspeople from Paraná (state)